Parasyrphus lineolus is a Holarctic species of hoverfly.

Description
External images
For terms see Morphology of Diptera
Wing length 7·25-8·25 mm. Black face stripe. Leg 3 black with at most knee yellow, apex of tibiae 3 black. Tarsi 1 all segments black. Pterostigma dark grey. The male genitalia are figured by Hippa (1968).  and Vockeroth (1969). The Larva is described and figured by Heiss (1938) . 
See references for determination.

Distribution
Palearctic Fennoscandia South to the Pyrenees. Ireland East through Central Europe and South Europe (North Italy and the Balkans), then East into European Russia and from the Urals through Siberia to the Pacific coast (Kamchatka, Sakhalin Is.) Nearctic Alaska to Quebec South to Colorado and New Mexico.

Biology
Habitat: Abies, Picea, Pinus forest. Flowers visited include yellow composites, white umbellifers, Acer platanoides, Achilea, Alchemilla, Anemone nemorosa, Calluna vulgaris, Caltha, Cardaminopsis, Galium, Inula, Meum, Petasites albus, Potentilla erecta, Prunus, Ranunculus, Rubus fruticosus, Salix, Sambucus nigra, Sorbus aucuparia, Taraxacum, Triplospermum inodorum, Valeriana officinalis, Veronica, Viburnum.
The flight period is April to July. The larva is aphid feeding.

References

Diptera of Europe
Syrphinae
Syrphini
Insects described in 1843
Taxa named by Johan Wilhelm Zetterstedt